Neotamias is a genus of chipmunks within the tribe Marmotini of the squirrel family. It contains 23 species, which mostly occur in western North America. Along with Eutamias, this genus is often considered a subgenus of Tamias.

Species 
Alpine chipmunk, Neotamias alpinus
Yellow-pine chipmunk  Neotamias amoenus
Buller's chipmunk,  Neotamias bulleri
Gray-footed chipmunk, Neotamias canipes
Gray-collared chipmunk, Neotamias cinereicollis
Cliff chipmunk, Neotamias dorsalis
Durango chipmunk, Neotamias durangae
Merriam's chipmunk, Neotamias merriami
Least chipmunk, Neotamias minimus
California chipmunk, Neotamias obscurus
Yellow-cheeked chipmunk, Neotamias ochrogenys
Palmer's chipmunk, Neotamias palmeri
Panamint chipmunk, Neotamias panamintinus
Long-eared chipmunk, Neotamias quadrimaculatus
Colorado chipmunk, Neotamias quadrivittatus
Red-tailed chipmunk,  Neotamias ruficaudus
Hopi chipmunk,  Neotamias rufus
Allen's chipmunk, Neotamias senex
Siskiyou chipmunk,  Neotamias siskiyou
Sonoma chipmunk  Neotamias sonomae
Lodgepole chipmunk,  Neotamias speciosus
Townsend's chipmunk,  Neotamias townsendii
Uinta chipmunk,  Neotamias umbrinus

References 

Musser, G. G.; Durden, L. A.; Holden, M. E.; and Light, J. E. (2010) "Systematic review of endemic Sulawesi squirrels (Rodentia, Sciuridae), with descriptions of new species of associated sucking lice (Insecta, Anoplura), and phylogenetic and zoogeographic assessments of sciurid lice." Bulletin of the American Museum of Natural History 339.
Piaggio, A. J. and Spicer, G. S. 2001. "Molecular phylogeny of the chipmunks inferred from mitochondrial cytochrome b and cytochrome oxidase II gene sequences." Molecular Phylogenetics and Evolution 20: 335–350.

 
Rodent genera